The 2001 Konica V8 Supercar Series was an Australian motor racing competition for V8 Supercars. It was the second running of the second tier series for V8 Supercars. The series was contested over six rounds held across four different states, commencing on 25 February at Wakefield Park and concluding on 11 August at Mallala Motor Sport Park.

The series was won by Simon Wills who was victorious in ten of the 18 races. Wills finished 82 points clear of Paul Dumbrell.

Teams and drivers
The following teams and drivers competed during the series.

Series calendar
The series was contested over six rounds with three races per round.

An additional non-points "special event", the Konica V8 Supercar Challenge, was held at the Mount Panorama Circuit, Bathurst on 6 October as a support race to the 2001 V8 Supercar 1000.

Points system
The season consisted of six rounds across four different states. Each round consisted of three races. Points were awarded for all cars who started each race in finishing order and then in order that they retired from the race. Points may have been offered for race positions lower than 24th but at no race during the series did more than 24 cars start.

Series standings

References

External links
 2001 Racing Results Archive
 Images from Australian Konica V8 Supercar Series - Round 2 Qualifying, Oran Park Raceway, 17 March 2001, erksports.tripod.com, as archived at web.archive.org

See also
 2001 V8 Supercar season

Konica
Supercars Development Series